The Assassination of Matteotti is a 1973 Italian historical drama film directed by Florestano Vancini. The film tells the events that led to the tragic end of Giacomo Matteotti and to the establishment of the dictatorship of Benito Mussolini in Italy.  It was awarded with the Special Jury Prize at the 8th Moscow International Film Festival.

Plot
In Rome on 30 May 1924, the Honorable Giacomo Matteotti, secretary of the Unitarian Socialist Party, in a courageous and engaging speech, asks for the elections of 6 April 1924 to be cancelled and contests their validity. The politician claims that in fact, the government majority list was only nominally supported by more than 4 million votes, but it did not obtain the votes in fact and freely. The result he says was illegitimate because of the retaliation and the violence propagated by the National Fascist Party.

His words immediately arouse reactions in the press and in public opinion, and the fear of popular uprisings is also unleashed within the government. Nothing prevents the mysterious kidnapping of the deputy on 10 June. Public opinion is upset, and the political opposition coagulates and decides to boycott the work of Parliament. It is difficult to start investigations for the rescue of Matteotti, but the media and public pressure force Benito Mussolini to make decisions. A speech is delivered to the Chamber by the future Duce on 3 January 1925 that will turn out to be the real beginning of his dictatorship.

Cast 
Mario Adorf as Benito Mussolini
Franco Nero as Giacomo Matteotti
Umberto Orsini as Amerigo Dumini
Vittorio De Sica as Mauro Del Giudice
Renzo Montagnani as Umberto Tancredi
Gastone Moschin as Filippo Turati
Mario Maffei as Emilio De Bono
Max Dorian as Roberto Farinacci
Orazio Stracuzzi as Giovanni Marinelli
Antonio La Raina as Alfredo Rocco
Stefano Oppedisano as Piero Gobetti
Manuela Kustermann as Ada Gobetti
Riccardo Cucciolla as Antonio Gramsci
Damiano Damiani as Giovanni Amendola
Giovanni Brusatori as Emilio Lussu
Manlio Busoni as Claudio Treves
Giulio Girola as Vittorio Emanuele III
Cesare Barbetti as Cesare Rossi
Pietro Biondi as Filippo Filippelli
Giorgio Favretto as Giovanni Gronchi
Michele Malaspina as Archbishop Pietro Gasparri
Ezio Marano as Alcide De Gasperi
José Quaglio as Police Chief Bertini
Gianni Solaro as General Attorney Crisafulli
Gino Santercole as General of the Militia
Piero Gerlini as Giuseppe Emanuele Modigliani
Franco Silva as Benedetto Fasciolo
Maurizio Arena as "Compagno" Romolo

References

Further reading
 Lucio Battistrada, Florestano Vancini, Il delitto Matteotti, Capelli, 1973

External links

1973 films
1973 drama films
Italian drama films
1970s Italian-language films
Films directed by Florestano Vancini
Films set in Rome
Films set in 1924
Films set in 1925
Films about Fascist Italy
Films about Benito Mussolini
1970s Italian films